Mikel Azcona Troyas (born 25 June 1996) is a Spanish auto racing driver who competes in the World Touring Car Cup for PWR Racing. He won the TCR Europe Touring Car Series championship in 2018 and 2021 and the WTCR championship in 2022.

Racing career

Early career
Azcona began his karting career at the age of 6 with a kart bought by his father. participated in Spanish karting championships where in 2009, he finished second in the Cadet class in the national championship and in the XXI Series, and in 2010, finishing in fourth place in the KF3 class.

In 2012, he made the transition from karting to touring car competitions, since it was where Azcona saw a professional future if he stood out in those races, instead of single-seater competitions. He started at the age of 15 with the car that would compete continuously for the following years, the Renault Clio with which he would participate in Class 2 of the CER together with Diego Rodríguez. He finished that year in third position in the CER Ferodo Sport Challenge. In 2013 he made his debut in the Spanish Renault Clio Cup Spain, where he took his first victory as a professional racer and finished in ninth place in the standings. Also that year, he managed to prevail in the Clio class of the Open Cup of Circuito de Navarra.

Move to Europe
The following year, Azcona joined PCR Sport and finished fifth in Renault Clio Cup Spain. Within Joaquín Rodrigo's team, he competed in the last of the four seasons of the Renault Clio Eurocup, where finished runner-up in 2012 and 2014, behind compatriot Oscar Nogués. Also in 2014, he would have his first endurance test, participating in the Maxi Endurance 32H with two different teams.  In 2015, he continued in Renault Clio Cup Spain where he finished second and made his debut in the Seat Léon Eurocup, winning at Circuit Paul Ricard and took three additional podiums, finishing third in the season. He continued in the Seat Léon Eurocup in the 2016 season. He won four races and eight podiums, but they were not enough to become champion and he was runner-up behind Niels Langeveld. He also made four appearances in Renault Clio Cup Spain, winning two of them and finished fifth in the drivers standings. In these two years he was signed to PCR Sport.

In 2017, Azcona participated in the Audi Sport TT Cup, winning six races during the season: two at the Norisring, one at Zandvoort, two at Nürburgring and one at Hockenheimring and finished in second place three times. He finished runner-up in the standings behind Philip Ellis, who had achieved two more podiums than Azcona.

TCR Series

Cupra (2018–2021)
The following year, Azcona went on to compete in the TCR Europe, returning to the PCR Sport team and drove a Cupra León, he took a win at Zandvoort, five podium finishes and 10 top-five finishes. His regularity allowed him to beat Jean-Karl Vernay to finally get his first title. 10 For the 2019 season, he moved to the World Touring Car Cup with a Cupra León from PWR Racing, becoming the brand's official driver. He obtained his first victory at Vila Real. and finished sixth in the drivers' standings.

Azcona was the subject of controversy at the final race of the 2019 WTCR season in Malaysia after influencing the outcome of the championship. While trying to overtake title contender Esteban Guerrieri for the race lead, he hit Guerrieri's car, pushing him off the track from a title-clinching position and forcing him to pit, which cost him the chance to win the title. Azcona was given a 30-second time penalty for the incident.

In 2021, Azcona also completed a WTCR-European double program, also contesting the first season of the ETCR and completing other national championship races in Spain, Italy and Germany. In the WTCR, he finished in seventh in the final classification, after a somewhat weak start to the season and only achieving a victory in the penultimate race. In the European championship, however, he managed to dominate the season despite missing the third round held at the Zandvoort circuit. By proclaiming himself the winner of the championship in the race on Saturday in Barcelona, Azcona flew to the Czech Republic that same day to be able to compete the two WTCR races in Most the following day.

Hyundai (2022–)
In 2022, Azcona changed scenery by signing as an official driver for Hyundai Motorsport, his main focus was winning the WTCR championship, a milestone that would be somewhat marred by the withdrawal of the Lynk & Co team in halfway in the season, the controversies with the failures of the Goodyear tires and the cancellation of several of the final rounds for various reasons. At the same time, he returned to participate in the ETCR where this time he finished in fifth place, achieving only one victory in Vallelunga and managed to win in the TCR category of the 24 Hours of Nürburgring. Azcona clinched the WTCR Drivers' championship during the qualifying session of the FIA WTCR Race of Saudi Arabia making him the last driver to do so.

Racing record

Career summary

† As Azcona was a guest driver, he was ineligible to score points.
* Season still in progress.

Complete TCR Europe Touring Car Series results
(key) (Races in bold indicate pole position) (Races in italics indicate fastest lap)

Complete World Touring Car Cup results
(key) (Races in bold indicate pole position) (Races in italics indicate fastest lap)

* Season still in progress.

TCR Spa 500 results

Notes

References

External links
  
 

  

1996 births
Living people
People from Arrigorriaga
Spanish racing drivers
SEAT León Eurocup drivers
European Touring Car Cup drivers
World Touring Car Cup drivers
TCR International Series drivers
Sportspeople from Biscay
Audi Sport TT Cup drivers
Nürburgring 24 Hours drivers
World Touring Car Champions
Hyundai Motorsport drivers
Cupra Racing drivers
Zengő Motorsport drivers
TCR Europe Touring Car Series drivers